Ridge, Texas may refer to:

Ridge, Mills County, Texas
Ridge, Robertson County, Texas